William Alexander Devlin (30 July 1899 – 23 July 1972) was a Scottish professional footballer, best remembered for his two spells as a centre forward in the Scottish League with Cowdenbeath, for whom he scored 123 goals in 155 appearances. He also played for Scottish League clubs Heart of Midlothian, King's Park, Clyde and for Football League clubs Huddersfield Town and Liverpool.

Personal life 
Devlin's brother Tom was also a footballer.

Career statistics

Honours 
Cowdenbeath

 Scottish League Second Division second-place promotion: 1923–24

Individual

Scottish League First Division top scorer (2): 1924–25, 1925–26
Cowdenbeath Hall of Fame

References

External links
LFC History profile

1899 births
Place of death missing
Scottish footballers
Footballers from Bellshill
Association football forwards
English Football League players
Cowdenbeath F.C. players
Huddersfield Town A.F.C. players
Liverpool F.C. players
Clyde F.C. players
King's Park F.C. players
Heart of Midlothian F.C. players
Macclesfield Town F.C. players
Mansfield Town F.C. players
Burton Town F.C. players
Shelbourne F.C. players
Bangor City F.C. players
Boston United F.C. players
Ashton National F.C. players
Olympique de Marseille players
Scottish expatriate footballers
Expatriate footballers in France
Expatriate footballers in Switzerland
Scottish league football top scorers
Scottish Football League players
1972 deaths
Scottish expatriate sportspeople in France
Scottish expatriate sportspeople in Switzerland